"Summer Again" is a song by Japanese singer-songwriter Ayumi Hamasaki. It was released as a digital single only on July 1, 2022.

The song placed at number 2 on the Oricon Daily Digital Singles Chart upon release, and debuted at number 18 on the Oricon Weekly Digital Singles Chart.

Background
On June 10, 2022, it was announced that a new song called "Summer Again" would be released as a digital single on July 1, 2022.

Writing and production
The song's lyrics were written by Hamasaki while composition was handled by Hajime Kato, marking their first time working together. The arrangement was handled by long-time collaborator Tasuku.

Lyrically, the song is about "regaining that summer" as well as the "feeling of freedom" during this season.

Release
The song was released on digital platforms and streaming services at midnight on July 1, 2022.

Music video
The music video for the song was released on July 2, 2022 – a day after the single's release date.
The video was filmed on Ishigaki Island and features the singer and her dancers performing by the sea, with Hamasaki wearing a golden outfit.

Commercial performance
The song debuted at number two on the Oricon Daily Digital Single Chart with 1,983 copies sold. 
With three day's worth of sales due to its being released in the middle of the charting week, it entered the Oricon Weekly Digital Singles Chart at number 18, having sold 2,954 downloads.

Additionally, "Summer Again" debuted at number 20 on the Billboard Japan Top Download Songs chart.

Track listing

Digital download

Charts

References

2022 songs
Ayumi Hamasaki songs
Songs written by Ayumi Hamasaki